Temra Costa is an American sustainable food advocate and author of Farmer Jane: Women Changing the Way We Eat. The book focuses on women's involvement in improving the sustainability of the U.S. food system, it includes biographies and interviews with women farmers, educators, chefs and activists.

Costa graduated from the University of Wisconsin, Madison with a degree in International Agriculture and a minor in Women's Studies before moving to California in 2002. While living in California she led a state campaign to encourage consumers to buy locally produced food, serving as Buy Fresh Buy Local campaign manager for Community Alliances with Family Farmers. She lives outside Sebastopol, California.

References

American non-fiction writers